Raja Hayder (born 31 August 1948, date of death unknown) was a Tunisian volleyball player. He competed in the men's tournament at the 1972 Summer Olympics.

References

1948 births
Living people
Tunisian men's volleyball players
Olympic volleyball players of Tunisia
Volleyball players at the 1972 Summer Olympics
Place of birth missing (living people)